Arnold Weiberg-Aurdal (18 June 1925 – 3 February 2016) was a Norwegian agronomist, military officer and politician for the Centre Party.

He was born in Ålesund as a son of physician Bastian Weiberg-Aurdal (1891–1973) and nurse Elise Ringdal (1892–1959). He finished his secondary education in 1944, took agricultural school in 1945 and infantry training in 1947. He also served in the Independent Norwegian Brigade Group in Germany before graduating from the Norwegian College of Agriculture in 1953. He settled at the farm Velle in Sykkylven in the same year. He worked as the municipal agronomist of Stranda from 1954 to 1962 and of Sykkylven from 1962 to 1982. He was also a conscripti officer from 1958 to 1980, with the rank of lieutenant.

He was a member of Sykkylven municipal council from 1955 to 1971 and 1987 to 1991, serving as mayor in 1963–1969 and 1990–1991. From 1963 to 1971 he was also a member of Møre og Romsdal county council. He chaired the local party chapter from 1962 to 1963. He was elected to the Parliament of Norway from Møre og Romsdal in 1969, and was re-elected on three occasions in 1973, 1977 and 1981. He chaired the Standing Committee on Transport and Communications during the two middle periods.

He was a board member of Privatbanken in Sykkylven from 1960 to 1975, Sunnmørsbanken from 1975 to 1990 (chair until 1980) and Stranda og Sykkylven Billag from 1963 to 1990 (chair since 1973). Nationally he was a board member of Televerket from 1985 to 1993. He was a lay judge in Sunnmøre District Court from 1976 to 1992 and a member of the court of appeal until 2000. In 2003 he was decorated with the King's Medal of Merit in gold.

References

1925 births
2016 deaths
Politicians from Ålesund
People from Sykkylven
Norwegian College of Agriculture alumni
Norwegian Army personnel
Members of the Storting
Centre Party (Norway) politicians
Mayors of places in Møre og Romsdal
Recipients of the King's Medal of Merit in gold
20th-century Norwegian politicians